The Assistant Secretary of State for Global Public Affairs is the head of the Bureau of Global Public Affairs within the United States Department of State. The Assistant Secretary of State for Global Public Affairs reports to the Secretary of State and the Under Secretary of State for Public Diplomacy and Public Affairs. The position was formed on May 28, 2019 with the merging of the Bureau of International Information Programs and the Bureau of Public Affairs.

Officeholders

References

External links
Official Website
Archived version of the 2009-2017 Website

 
Bureau of Public Affairs
1944 establishments in Washington, D.C.